Street style is fashion that is considered to have emerged not from studios, but from the grassroots. Street fashion is generally associated with youth culture, and is most often seen in major urban centers. Magazines and newspapers like the New York Times and Elle commonly feature candid photographs of individuals wearing urban, stylish clothing. Mainstream fashion often appropriates street fashion trends as influences. Most major youth subcultures have had an associated street fashion. Street style is different all around the globe.

Description
The "street" approach to style and fashion is often based on individualism, rather than focusing solely on current fashion trends. Using street style methods, individuals demonstrate their multiple, negotiated identities, in addition to utilizing subcultural and intersecting styles or trends. This, in itself, is a performance, as it creates a space where identities can be explored through the act(ion) of dress.

Bill Cunningham for The New York Times, pointed street style out as a keen catalogue of ordinary people's clothing. Also, he mentioned that streets tell a great deal about fashion and people, if you listen. According to him the best fashion show is coming to life every day on the streets.

Street style is a viral, instant, addictive facet of fashion that has changed many of the ways in which fashion is made and consumed. Its fast characteristic links it also to the term consumerism. Given how styles change over time, it also challenges the use of fast fashion in relation to the purchasing and wearing of clothing, as this conceals the complexities of practice.

Development of street style
Street style has always existed but it has become a phenomenon of 20th century. The increase in the standardization of life after World War II (suburbanization, mass marketing, the spread of television) may be linked to the appeal of "alternative" lifestyles for individuals in search of  "identity". Industrial production, particularly in the sphere of fashion, was  not only the popularization of stylists’ tastes that move from high fashion, through prêt-à-porter, to the peripheries of the system. These were also tastes that originated among economically disfavored, marginal groups, the whole range of metropolitan tribes, that are able to trigger new fashion production and diffusion processes.

Phenomena of this kind have been studied for a long time in England and have revealed the importance of young people's street styles during the post-war period, which may be linked to the generation of baby boomers, who came to represent a new sociocultural category—the "teenager"—who has money to spend and be an important motivation on economic and cultural world.

The history of identity and the history of clothing run on two parallel rails. In this connection, street style works as a facilitator of group identity and subcultural cohesion. Since the close of World War II, Western culture has seen a dramatic decline in the significance of the traditional sociocultural divisions such as race, religion, ethnicity, regionalism, nationalism, in defining and limiting personal identity. The tribe groupings, such as bikers, beats, and teddy boys in the 1950s; mods, hippies, and skinheads in the 1960s; headbangers, punks, and b-boys in the 1970s; and goths, new age travelers and ravers in the 1980s got dressed and unusual body decoration as an expression to create a sense of identity.

In the first half of the twentieth century, although the unaccompanied figure of the woman in the street was seen increasingly frequently in fashion photographs she often remained bound by the feminine pursuits of a bourgeois existence, with the reality of the street a beautifying prop to the unreal fantasy of high-end fashion. As an object of gaze, her position contrasted with that of the flâneur and the male privileged code of visual spectatorship. It was until the post-war period, with the emergence of style-conscious magazines aimed at men that the image of the flaneur, somewhat melded with the more modern notion of the "man about town", began to be visualized in fashion photography. Metropolitan masculinity was shown to be influenced by the industrial atmosphere of the metropolis. This is well illustrated by Terence Donovan's grainy black and white photographs of sharply suited men in "Spy Drama" for the October 1962 issue of Town which became famous as the visual influence for the filmic interpretation of James Bond. In this period, the representation of the woman in the street was radicalized by the emergence of youth as a social category and its claiming of street culture as its primary context.

Influence of sport practices on street style

Street style itself is an application of ordinary people included the people who use their sport outfits on their daily basis. However, it is obvious that they get affected by supermodels who are working for various sportives brands. Therefore, it gets easier to influence ordinary people with the sense of sportive clothing.

Sport practice which particularly influenced the forming of a street style is skateboarding. The image of the street style follower often corresponds with skateboarding practice.  Sneakers with the special soles that keep the feet from slipping on the board came to street style and were founded in wardrobes of not skaters.

Key sites
The process of consumption is closely linked to the fashion phenomenon, to the process of establishing fashion and to branding, as well as, to fashion forecasting. Apparently, fashion can be researched by means of consumer patterns and integrated into the contemporary urban environment.
Moreover, by setting consumer trends, fashion agents (e.g. designers, street style activists, trendsetters, bloggers, fashion retailers and models) influence a city's representation. These trends can mark shopping areas and entertainment locations, or provide concrete city routes and scripts not merely oriented towards consumption but specifically towards 'conscious' consumption in keeping with fashion trends. From the interdisciplinary perspective of consumption and consumer practices, city tourism is connected to city branding, through which a city's representation is aimed at attracting visitors and consumers.

Milan
Milan can be a good example of how fashion practices contributed into development and commercialization of the city. Milan Street fashion is one of the most popular and respectful in the world of street fashion. The reason why it became such a success can be linked to the fact that a huge number of important fashion institutions, agencies and events are located in Milan. The expression 'capitale della moda' (the capital of fashion) refers to Milan when describing styles, urban life, fashion collections, designers and so on; thus, constructing the Milan fashion discourse with a visible fashion image and motivating other cities to compete for this fashion, branded city status.

Paris
Paris occupies the same niche as one of the most respected fashion centers in general and street style, in particular. Just as Milan in Italy, Paris's look can be considered through frameworks of fashion fads, designers, a chic and luxury capital, artists and a bohemian lifestyle. Secondly, Paris is a perfect example of creating  the  ‘city look’, a collective image – certain fashion garments, specifics and lifestyles embody definite urbanity in a city's context. For instance, an image of 'La Parisienne', – the typical Parisian woman – does consist not only of clothing but also of certain manners, values and behavioural patterns associated with the country and its citizens.  One of the most typical associations with Paris is that it is the city of love and fashion, a romantic city full of chic and luxury. The fashion phenomenon can provide strong associations and a clear understanding of Paris as a centre of fashion, love and dreams.

Japan
Japanese fashion has inspired many fashion professionals in the West, starting with Kenzō Takada's appearance in Paris in 1970 followed by Issey Miyake in 1973, Hanae Mori in 1977, Yohji Yamamoto and Rei Kawakubo of Comme des Garçons in 1981. Japan is gradually becoming a country that is a genuine force in the field of fashion. Today's Japanese fashion contributes both to the aesthetics of fashion as well as to how business is made in this industry.

Japanese street fashion sustains multiple simultaneous highly diverse fashion movements at any given time. It does not come from the famous professional Japanese designers, but is led by high school girls who have become extremely influential in controlling fashion trends. These fashion conscious, or fashion-obsessed, youngsters indirectly and directly dictate this type of Japanese fashion. It is not an exaggeration to say that they are the agents of fashion, who take part in the production and dissemination of fashion. Japanese street fashion emerges from the social networks among different institutions of fashion as well as various street subcultures, each of which is identified with a unique and original look. These teens rely on a distinctive appearance to proclaim their symbolic, subcultural identity. This identity is not political or ideological; it is simply innovative fashion that determines their group affiliation.

London
London is considered one of the most important fashion capitals but in contrast to Milan and Paris, London's look is closer to the fashion sense of royalty, traditions and strong street style culture.

Just as cities mentioned above, London is a place where respected brands are to be found, such as Stella McCartney, Burberry,  Alexander McQueen, etc., which can be a direct consequence of people's growing interest and involvement into fashion itself . London. on the other hand, was a pioneer in the development and promotion of second- hand markets which speaks about other underground tendencies in street style. Being a multinational city with an immense concentration of the whole range of cultures and traditions they carry, London is identified as a space where street style embodies not only the general popular fashion concepts, but also works as a tool to express social and cultural identity.

Other important aspect of London's peculiar image is a recent collaboration between the Duchess of Cambridge and Alexander McQueen fashion brand. Clothes produced for the Duchess can be called revolutionary in a certain sense, as they are woman-friendly, less pretentious and dramatic. This speaks about a certain democratization of the brand, that becomes more affordable for common consumers and perceived as a street style item rather than high fashion royal attribute.

One of the major reasons London has proved itself as a street style centre in Europe is  that British fashion players are seen as more open and flexible in terms of innovative approaches to fashion and cooperation with young promising talents. This attitude creates more open-mindedness and affability with regard to street style and promotion of sustainable fashion practices.

New York

The practice of photo shooting models, still in runway makeup, in front of open warehouse spaces and garages or just on the street came from the fashion capital of the United States. Starting with the Gibson girl of the 1890s, the free-spirited Flapper fashions of the 1920s, and the rugged, masculine work-wear of the 1930s and 40s, American culture has been especially influential in the creation of street style, with music movements like jazz, rock, disco, and hip hop, American sports and recreational pursuits like basketball, baseball, motorcycle riding, surfing and skateboarding, countercultural movements like the hippy movement, punk, grunge and associated "anti-fashion", and image-based cultural industries like Hollywood all having exerted a significant amount of influence on New York's fashion and design.

It is beyond question that this city plays the role of one of the most important trend setters in regards to street style. New York Fashion Week was the world's first fashion week. Historic fashion magazines like Vogue, Harper's Bazaar, and Cosmopolitan have been the world's pre-eminent fashion publications for over a century. Neighborhoods like the East Village, Greenwich Village, and Williamsburg, Brooklyn have been hot spots for street style, the latter having helped give rise to the hipster revival of the 2000s and 2010s.

India

Street style in India is getting on its way by copying this style generally from the bollywood movies. As Indians are always fascinated by fashion, in India, different religions help in achieving this street style. 

Street style or the garments that are achieving their position in India mainly in youth. This style is making their own arena in this world.

Effects of social media on street style

Fashion bloggers
Social media channels have become an efficient way in fashion practices to keep in touch with the consumer base as well as increase it through brand exposure. Blogs that focus on fashion brands and  products, street style and personal style in particular are the largest categories of the blogs.  Fashion blogs, or style blogs, are blogs that focus on fashion and beauty and are produced by bloggers who self-identify as stylists, creating their own authentic looks and exposing them in urban spaces.

As the result of the immense outspread of fashion blogs, the level of engagement between the individual and fashion industry has risen dramatically, the gap between fashion houses, publications, and individuals is narrowing. Within the everyday people can communicate via the blogosphere, sharing their personal, individualized expressions of self.

By utilizing texts, including images and narratives, from fashion blogs, individuals can view, and thus, approach dress from an innovative, individualized perspective. Fashion choices are more visible, accessible, and relatable through the fashion blog space due to these sites’ availability, user-friendliness, and constant change (i.e., uploading of new images and narratives). Blogs, in contrast to traditional fashion practices, represent varied images and bodies. However, it has been found that fashion blog imagery is not that different from those bodies featured in fashion editorials: there is often an emphasis on thinness, height, and whiteness. Yet these sites also include images of women that are raced or gendered, which does present an alternative view, as well as male bodies (not common in mainstream fashion editorials for the female subscriber).

Instagram

Instagram, a leading mobile application for stylizing and sharing photos on the web, has proved  popular not only among street style amateurs, but also among street style photographers, some of whom have amassed followings in the thousands.

Instagram is viewed as relatively cheap, quick, flexible and widely available platform. It allows getting immediate feedback from the users, which makes it possible to stay up-to-date with latest changes and trends in fashion and in street style, in particular.  Instagram gave life to a specific instagram-based community of street style photographers and models, who also work as an additional channel of communication from fashion providers and consumers. Consequently, many of well-followed photographers started including more street style photography in their portfolios, which was not the case before Instagram.

In Instagram environment the focus is on visual image rather than on the content, that is why not everything from the street style galleries should be taken  at its face value.  Even though the street style photos from Instagram look  effortless, numerous attempts to make a perfect shot remain behind the photo. Moreover, the clothing that looks good in pictures, may seem rather theatrical and pretentious in real life, especially against the urban background.

Examples 
Examples from the 1950s, 1970s, 1980s, 1990s, 2000s, and 2010s include:

 Hippies (denim, bohemian style, long hair, flower power and psychedelic imagery, flared trousers)
 Teddy Boys (drape jackets, drainpipe trousers, crepe shoes)
 Punk fashion (ripped clothing, safety pins, bondage, provocative T-shirt slogans, Mohican hairstyle)
 Skinheads (short-cropped hair, fitted jeans, Ben Sherman button-up shirts, Fred Perry polo shirts, Harrington jackets, Dr. Martens boots)
 Gothic fashion (black clothing, heavy coats, poet shirts, big boots, makeup)
 Preppy (argyle sweaters, chinos, madras, Nantucket Reds, button down Oxford cloth shirts, and boat shoes). 
See also ghetto prep for a 21st-century variant influenced by hip-hop fashion.
 Hip hop fashion (ultra-baggy pants, ECKO, Tribal Gear, South Pole, Avirex, FUBU, Sean Jean, NIKE)
 Hipster or indie (glasses, jeans, beanies, sneakers, ties, suspenders, checked shirts, beards)
 Trendies (androgynous big hair, bright neon colors, skinny jeans, printed hoodies, keffiyehs)
 Rasta (African-inspired clothing, rastacap, dreadlocks)
 Greaser (subculture) (Levis 501 jeans, T-shirts, leather jackets, sunglasses, Cowboy boots or motorcycle boots, hair gel)
 Urban (colorful apparel, large accent jewelry, skinny jeans, jackets, T-shirts)
 Feminine (dresses, hats, sunglasses, hand bags, floral prints)
 Kawaii (tutu skirts, pastel and pink colors, anime, childish and Gothic Lolita inspired accessories such as wild hair clips or bows)

See also
 Bread and Butter tradeshow
 Consumer Behaviour
 Counterculture
 Cultural appropriation
 Fashion Design
 Haute Couture
 Purple Mark
 Streetwear
 Subculture

References

External links
“Why Fashion Photographers Are Flocking to Instagram”.
“New Zealand Street Style”.
“When Politics Became a Fashion Statement”.
“Why London Deserves to be the Fashion Capital of the World”.
“Street Unicorns: Bold Expressionists of Style” by Robbie Quinn.